The British Betrayal of the Assyrians is a book published in 1935 written by Yusuf Malek.

As an Assyrian who fought alongside the British during World War I as an Interpreter officer, and later a government official in the subsequently established country of Iraq which was under British Administration until 1932, his writings come from first hand experiences. 

Through the book, Malek reproduces letters from government officials while chronologically narrating the events which led to the formation of Iraq and the subsequent massacre of Assyrians, known as the Simele Massacre.

See also 

 Yusuf Malek
 Assyrian Levies
 Simele massacre

References 

Books about Assyrian people
Books about Iraq
Books about British politicians